The 1974 SCCA/USAC Formula 5000 Championship was the eighth running of the Sports Car Club of America's premier open wheel racing series. It was the first to be sanctioned jointly by the Sports Car Club of America (SCCA) and the United States Auto Club (USAC), and the first to be held under the "SCCA /USAC Formula 5000 Championship" name. Sponsorship by the L&M cigarette brand was not carried forward from the 1973 championship.

The championship was open to SCCA Formula 5000 cars and, for the first time, to USAC cars powered by 161 cid turbocharged, 255 cid double overhead camshaft or 305 cid "stock block" engines. It was won by Brian Redman driving a Lola T332 Chevrolet.

Race calendar

The championship was contested over seven races.

Points system
Championship points were awarded on a 20-15-12-10-8-6-4-3-2-1 basis for the first ten positions at each race.

Championship standings

References

External links
www.myf5000.com
www.oldracingcars.com

SCCA Continental Championship
Formula 5000
SCCA/USAC Formula 5000 Championship